Robin Seel (born 20 February 1940) is a British bobsledder. He competed in the four-man event at the 1964 Winter Olympics.

References

1940 births
Living people
British male bobsledders
Olympic bobsledders of Great Britain
Bobsledders at the 1964 Winter Olympics
Sportspeople from London